Patrick Laude is a scholar, author and teacher.  His works deal with the relationship between mysticism, symbolism and poetry, as well as focusing on contemporary spiritual figures such as Simone Weil, Louis Massignon and Frithjof Schuon.

Biography
Born in France in 1958, he took a graduate degree in philosophy at the University of Paris IV Sorbonne while studying at the Ecole Normale Supérieure in Paris. He came to the US in the early eighties and obtained his Ph.D. in 1985 from Indiana University. He joined Georgetown University in 1991. 
Laude's scholarly work is primarily focused on comparative mysticism, the symbolic imagination in religion and literature, and Western interpretations of Asian contemplative traditions. He is the author of several books and numerous articles on these subjects.

Bibliography
English
 Keys to the Beyond: Frithjof Schuon's Cross-Traditional Language of Transcendence (SUNY Press, 2020) 
 Shimmering Mirrors: Reality and Appearance in Contemplative Metaphysics East and West (SUNY Press, 2017), 
 Louis Massignon: The Vow and the Oath (Matheson Trust, 2011), 
 Pathways to an Inner Islam: Massignon, Corbin, Guénon and Schuon (SUNY Press, 2010), 
 Pray Without Ceasing: The Way of the Invocation in World Religions (World Wisdom, 2006), 
 Divine Play, Sacred Laughter, and Spiritual Understanding (Palgrave Macmillan, 2005)), 
 Singing the Way: Insights into Poetry & Spiritual Transformation (World Wisdom, 2005), 
 Frithjof Schuon: Life and Teachings (SUNY Press, 2004),  
 Music of the Sky: An Anthology of Spiritual Poetry (World Wisdom, 2004), 
 The Way of Poetry: Essays on Poetics and Contemplative Transformation, SUNY, 2002)

French
 Apocalypse des religions (L'Harmattan, 2016), 
 Massignon intérieur (L'Age d'Homme, Paris-Lausanne, 2001) 
 Dossier H Frithjof Schuon (L'Age d'Homme, Paris-Lausanne, 2001),  
 Approches du Quiétisme (Biblio 17, Tübingen, 1991)
 Rodenbach, les décors de silence : essai sur la poésie de Georges Rodenbach, (Labor, Bruxelles, 1990),

References

External links
 The Daily Hay Festival Dhaka Unfolding the Spiritual PathStar

Philosophy writers
1958 births
Living people
Traditionalist School